COTW may refer to:
The Call of the Wild, a novel by Jack London
Castle of the Winds, a role-playing video game for Windows
”Champion Of The World”, a song by Coldplay featured on their 2019 album Everyday Life
 Chart of the Week, a periodic technical-analysis column in Interactive Investor
Chicken of the Woods, various species of edible shelf mushrooms in the genus Laetiporus
Children of the World, an album by the Bee Gees
The "Coalition of the Willing" is a term for those nations which supported the 2003 invasion of Iraq
"Colors of the Wind", a song performed in the animated film Pocahontas
Committee of the Whole, a term used in some parliamentary proceedings